The 1985 Brecon and Radnor by-election was a parliamentary by-election held on 4 July 1985 for the British House of Commons constituency of Brecon and Radnor.

Previous MP
The seat had become vacant on 8 May 1985, when the constituency's Conservative Member of Parliament (MP), Tom Ellis Hooson, had died at the age of 52.  He was a cousin of Emlyn Hooson, the former Liberal Party MP for Montgomery.

Tom Hooson had been Brecon and Radnor's MP since the 1979 general election, when he gained the seat from the Labour Party.

Candidates
Seven candidates were nominated. Richard Arthur Lloyd Livsey was the candidate of the Liberal Party and represented the SDP-Liberal Alliance. He was a former senior lecturer in farm management, born in 1935, who had become a smallholder. He had contested the seat in the 1983 general election.

(Frederick) Richard Willey, born 1945, was the Labour candidate. He was the son of veteran Labour MP Fred Willey and a member of Radnor District Council. He was a freelance educational researcher and writer.

Christopher John Butler, born 1950, represented the Conservative Party. He was a special adviser to the Secretary of State for Wales and had previously worked at the Conservative Research Department in Wales and the Political Office in 10 Downing Street.

Janet Mary Davies was nominated by Plaid Cymru. She was born in 1938 and was a member of Taff Ely Borough Council.

Frequent election candidate and pop singer Screaming Lord Sutch (otherwise known as  David Edward Sutch) represented the Monster Raving Loony Party.

Roger Joseph Everest was an Independent candidate who sought election as a One Nation Conservative.

Andre Charles Leopold Genillard was an Independent who campaigned as a Free the World from Multiple Sclerosis candidate. He was a teacher at Mayfield College, Mayfield, and entered the election as an educational exercise for students before electoral deposits substantially increased.

Result

Aftermath

Livsey held the seat for the Liberals at the 1987 general election, with a  majority of just 56 over the Conservative Jonathan Evans with Labour dropping to third place. This meant that Brecon and Radnor was  the only seat that the Conservatives lost at a by-election in the 1983-1987 parliament that they failed to regain at the 1987 election. However at the 1992 general election the Conservatives did regain the seat, although Richard Livsey went on to regain it at the 1997 general election.

Previous result

See also
 2019 Brecon and Radnorshire by-election
 1939 Brecon and Radnorshire by-election
 Brecon and Radnorshire constituency
 List of United Kingdom by-elections
 United Kingdom by-election records

References

 Britain Votes/Europe Votes By-Election Supplement 1983-, compiled and edited by F.W.S. Craig (Parliamentary Research Services 1985)

External links
Campaign literature from the by-election

1985 in Wales
1980s elections in Wales
July 1985 events in the United Kingdom
Brecknockshire
Radnorshire
1985 elections in the United Kingdom
By-elections to the Parliament of the United Kingdom in Welsh constituencies